Massenburg is a surname. Notable people with the surname include:

G. Alvin Massenburg (1894–1968), American politician
George Massenburg, American recording engineer and inventor
Kedar Massenburg (born 1963), American record producer and record label executive
Tony Massenburg (born 1967), American basketball player
Walter B. Massenburg (born 1949), retired US Navy admiral